Alfred Clarence Redfield (November 15, 1890 – March 17, 1983) was an American oceanographer known for having discovered the Redfield ratio, which describes the ratio between nutrients in plankton and ocean water. In 1966, he received the Eminent Ecologist Award from the Ecological Society of America.  His research was used by James Lovelock in the formulation of the Gaia hypothesis, that "Organisms and their environment evolve as a single, self-regulating system." From 1918 to 1924, Redfield worked with Elizabeth M. Bright on studies that involved the effects of radiation and Nereis. In collaboration the team published 12 papers.

During his doctoral research, he studied the mechanism of horned toad skin coloration, identifying adrenaline as the primary control of skin coloration. He later studied the effects of X rays and radium radiation on the physiological action.

Following his graduation, he went on to study marine biology. He studied hemocyanin, which is the blood pigment of many invertebrate species, which binds oxygen, and characterized its physiological behavior.

During the 1930s, he discovered that the ratios between phosphorus, nitrogen and carbon of marine plankton are indistinguishable with their proportions in the open ocean. This idea was used to explain some characteristics of the carbon life cycle in the sea. This was one source of his famous aphorism, “Life in the sea cannot be understood without understanding the sea itself."

In the 1940, when World War II was taking place, there were some changes that occurred to the Oceanographic. Redfield was selected as the assistant director. At this time he focused on studying how to protect submarines that were submerged from surface ships and aircraft and the issue of polluting ships in marine invertebrates. He and his colleagues came to realize that submarines that have been submerged can regulate their resistance by shutting down its motors and staying quiet for hours. He then came up with an idea of installing bathythermographs which became a huge success.

Alfred C. Redfield was the great-grandson of noted Meteorologist William C. Redfield (1789 – 1857), who was the first president of the American Association for the Advancement of Science.

Accolades
A.C. Redfield Lifetime Achievement Award, presented annually by the American Society of Limnology and Oceanography

References

External links
 Biography  
 Biography (PDF)
 Ecological Society Awards page

1890 births
1983 deaths
American oceanographers